Mahoney Butte, at  above sea level is a peak in the Smoky Mountains of Idaho. The peak is located in Sawtooth National Forest in Blaine County. It is located in the watershed of Greenhorn Creek, a tributary of the Big Wood River. No roads or trails go to the summit, although the peak is most easily accessed from trails at the end of road 117.

References 

Mountains of Blaine County, Idaho
Mountains of Idaho
Sawtooth National Forest